Live Around the World is a live album by Meat Loaf, released in 1996 to capitalize on his two recent successes, Bat Out of Hell II: Back into Hell and Welcome to the Neighbourhood. The album was recorded at various times between 1987 and 1996. The album is limited to a release of 250,000 copies worldwide.

Track listing

Disc One
 "I'd Do Anything for Love (But I Won't Do That)" – 12:58 (Jim Steinman)
 "You Took the Words Right Out of My Mouth (Hot Summer Night)" – 8:53 (Steinman)
 "Life Is a Lemon and I Want My Money Back" – 7:47 (Steinman)
 "Rock and Roll Dreams Come Through" – 8:37 (Steinman)
 "Dead Ringer for Love" – 4:44 (Steinman)
 "Heaven Can Wait" – 5:39 (Steinman)
 "All Revved Up with No Place to Go" – 6:47 (Steinman)
 "Paradise by the Dashboard Light" – 15:54 (Steinman)

Disc Two
 "Wasted Youth" – 3:07 (Steinman)
 "Out of the Frying Pan (And into the Fire)" – 8:37 (Steinman)
 "Objects in the Rear View Mirror May Appear Closer than They Are" – 12:08 (Steinman)
 "Midnight at the Lost and Found" – 5:02 (Steve Buslowe / Dan Peyronel / Paul Christie / Meat Loaf)
 "Good Girls Go to Heaven (Bad Girls Go Everywhere)" – 6:43 (Steinman)
 "What You See Is What You Get" – 3:46 (Patti Jerome / Michael Valvano)
 "Two Out of Three Ain't Bad" – 8:17 (Steinman)
 "Hot Patootie (Whatever Happened to Saturday Night?)" – 3:02 (Richard O'Brien)
 "For Crying Out Loud" – 9:55 (Steinman)
 "Bat Out of Hell" – 10:55 (Steinman)

Personnel
Musical Director: Steve Buslowe

Meat Loaf — vocals
Pat Thrall — lead guitars
Kasim Sulton — rhythm guitars, keyboards, backing vocals
Steve Buslowe — bass, backing vocals
Mark Alexander — piano, keyboards, backing vocals
John Miceli — drums, percussion
Patti Russo — female lead and backing vocals
Pearl Aday — backing vocals

Special Guests
Paul Mirkovich — additional keyboards on "All Revved Up"
Jeff Bova — organ on "All Revved Up" and "What You See..."
Jim Steinman — piano on "Heaven Can Wait" and "Objects...", voice on "Wasted Youth"
Steve Lukather — additional guitar on "For Crying Out Loud"

References

Meat Loaf albums
1996 live albums